The Green E.P. is the follow up to Bibio's sixth studio album, Silver Wilkinson; it was announced on 3 December 2013, and was released on 27 January 2014.

The EP features archive music chosen to complement the track 'Dye The Water Green', taken from the album Silver Wilkinson. 'Dinghy' was recorded in 2006 by Bibio and Richard Roberts of Letherette, 'Carbon Wulf' is an improvised ambient version of 'Wulf' performed on baritone guitar, and 'The Spinney View of Hinkley Point' was the first Bibio song to feature live drums.

Track listing

References

Bibio albums
2014 EPs